In mathematics, Maillet's determinant Dp is the determinant of the matrix introduced by   whose entries are R(s/r) for s,r = 1, 2, ..., (p – 1)/2 ∈ Z/pZ for an odd prime p, where  and R(a) is the least positive residue of a mod p .  calculated the determinant Dp for p = 3, 5, 7, 11, 13 and found that in these cases it is given by (–p)(p – 3)/2, and conjectured that it is given by this formula in general.  showed that this conjecture is incorrect; the determinant in general is given by Dp = (–p)(p – 3)/2h−, where h− is the first factor of the class number of the cyclotomic field generated by pth roots of 1, which happens to be 1 for p less than 23. In particular this verifies Maillet's conjecture that the determinant is always non-zero. Chowla and Weil had previously found the same formula but did not publish it.
Their results have been extended to all non-prime odd numbers by K. Wang(1982).

References

Algebraic number theory
Determinants